Russell Barton (1830 – 30 June 1916) was a British-born Australian politician.

He was born at Penge to grazier Edmund Russell Barton and Sophia Russell. The family migrated to Adelaide in 1839, where Barton worked on cattle and sheep stations before becoming a carrier for a copper mine at Burra Burra. He went to the Victorian goldfields in the early 1850s and on his return bought land around Adelaide. In 1855 he married Jane McCulloch Davey, with whom he had eleven children. His property was destroyed by fire in 1855, and he managed a number of sheep stations, including one on the Bogan River in New South Wales. He focused on his New South Wales properties from the 1860s and also speculated in mining.

He was elected to the New South Wales Legislative Assembly for Bourke at the 1880 election, holding the seat at the 1882, and 1885 elections. He resigned his seat in December 1886, and a by-election was held, however parliament was dissolved before the writ was returned.

References

 

1830 births
1916 deaths
Members of the New South Wales Legislative Assembly
British emigrants to Australia